Daniel Mögling is the name of:

 Daniel Mögling (1546-1603), physician and professor of medicine
 Daniel Mögling (1596-1635), alchemist and Rosicrucian